Château-Chalon is a commune in the Jura department, Bourgogne-Franche-Comté, eastern France.

The commune is perched on a cliff in the first fold of the Jura mountains. It is reached from the west by a road with numerous hairpin curves. Its location has earned it nomination as one of the Most Beautiful Villages of France.

Although the west side of the village is a sheer cliff, the east side slopes gently away in vineyards known for their wine, including their white wine, Château-Chalon AOC.

Population

See also
 Communes of the Jura department

References

Communes of Jura (department)
Plus Beaux Villages de France